Jules Bruff is an American actress and filmmaker. She is known for her portrayal of Catherine Allen in David Fincher's  2007 film Zodiac.

Jules co-wrote, produced and starred in Part Time Fabulous in 2011. Jules won Best Actress at the Monaco Charity Film Festival and Los Angeles' Feel Good Film Festival.

Filmography

Film

Television

References

American actresses
Living people
Year of birth missing (living people)
21st-century American women